The 2016 L'Open Emeraude Solaire de Saint-Malo was a professional tennis tournament played on outdoor clay courts. It was the 21st edition of the tournament and part of the 2016 ITF Women's Circuit, offering a total of $50,000+H in prize money. It took place in Saint-Malo, France, on 19–25 September 2016.

Singles main draw entrants

Seeds 

 1 Rankings as of 12 September 2016.

Other entrants 
The following player received a wildcard into the singles main draw:
  Audrey Albié
  Joséphine Boualem
  Fiona Ferro
  Esther Thébault

The following players received entry from the qualifying draw:
  Beatriz Haddad Maia
  Eleni Kordolaimi
  Alice Matteucci
  Camilla Rosatello

The following player received entry by a lucky loser spot:
  Harmony Tan

The following player received entry by a special exempt:
  Chloé Paquet

The following player received entry by a protected ranking:
  Claire Feuerstein

Champions

Singles

 Maryna Zanevska def.  Camilla Rosatello, 6–1, 6–3

Doubles

 Lina Gjorcheska /  Diāna Marcinkēviča def.  Alexandra Cadanțu /  Jaqueline Cristian, 3–6, 6–3, [10–8]

External links 
 2016 L'Open Emeraude Solaire de Saint-Malo at ITFtennis.com
 Official website 

2016 ITF Women's Circuit
2016 in French tennis
L'Open 35 de Saint-Malo